is a Catholic Japanese women's university in Chōfu, Tokyo. The university comprises four Departments of Literature and a graduate school. This all-female institution is well known as Shirayuri Women's University, although its official name is Shirayuri College. It is a research and liberal arts college. It was formed by three nuns and a priest from France.

History
Shirayuri University traces its origin to the Convent of Saint Paul Chartre, which was founded in a small village in France at the end of the 17th century. Ever since its founding the sisterhood, with its headquarters in Rome, has taken service and education as its mission and has devoted itself to education and welfare activities all over the world.

Activities in Japan began with the arrival of three French nuns in Hakodate, in 1878, with an ardent mission to establish a convent. Three years later, a school was founded in Kanda, Tokyo, beginning the groundwork for Shirayuri Gakuen. In 1965, the present Shirayuri College, a four-year institution, was established.

Since then, the college has been lauded for expanding and enhancing the curricula and facilities to include a graduate school for each the four departments, enriching the program and providing an education based on the spirit of Catholicism.

School mission
The president of the university mentions that the school's goal is "to pursue truth, polish their [student's] intellect, learn to empathize with other, know the joys of serving others and deepen their awareness of the true beauty of all the natural things and happenings which surround them."

School system
The university can be a continuation of Shirayuri Pre-school, Shirayuri Elementary School, and Shirayuri Middle/High School. Students can first enter Shirayuri Pre-school and continue their education till graduating the university (20% of the students stay till college). Many begin their Shirayuri education in the university.

Quality of education
Although the university is famous for its title, Shirayuri Pre-school to High School is evidently famous for its high level which competes with top-level schools in Japan.

Shirayuri boasts their high-level courses and offers:

Japanese Literature Major
French
English
Children's Literature/Culture
Children's Literature
Psychology
Research School (Graduate school): co-ed
Developmental Psychology
Foreign Language/Literature, etc.

Culture
The emblem depicts a fleur-de-lys holding a sword. Since it is a French-related mission school, the Sister who takes care of the college is referred to by the students as 'Masul' or "Ma Soeur" (i.e., " My Sister" in French).

It is a very small school with homeroom classes that are led by the Sisters. Although there is a strong impression that it is a school for upper-class girls, it could be seen as a place where classes and good manners are taught strictly rather than as a place where children of wealthy families flock. Since the campus transferred in 1965, it owns modern school buildings and a chapel.

Their sister school is Sendai Shirayuri Women's College.

References

External links
 Official website 
 Official website

Private universities and colleges in Japan
Women's universities and colleges in Japan
Universities and colleges in Tokyo
Catholic universities and colleges in Japan
1881 establishments in Japan
Educational institutions established in 1881
Chōfu, Tokyo